Jóhann is a masculine given name. It is the Icelandic and Faroese form of the name Johann, a form of the Germanic and Latin given name "Johannes". The English-language form is John.

The Icelandic surname Jóhannsson is a patronymic surname meaning son of Jóhann. Jóhannsdóttir is a patronymic surname meaning daughter of Jóhann.

People 

People with the name include:

 , Icelandic scriptwriter
 Jóhann Berg Guðmundsson (born 1990), Icelandic professional footballer
 Jóhann Birnir Guðmundsson (born 1977), retired Icelandic footballer
 Jóhann Hafstein (1915–1980), Icelandic politician; prime minister of Iceland 1970–1971
 Jóhann Haraldsson (born 1979), Icelandic alpine skier
  (born 1939), Icelandic author, translator and cultural journalist
 Jóhann Hjartarson (born 1963), Icelandic chess grandmaster
  (born 1954), association football player
 Jóhann Jóhannsson (1969–2018), Icelandic composer
 Jóhann Laxdal (born 1990), Icelandic football player
 Jóhann K. Pétursson (1913–1984), Icelandic man with gigantism
 Jóhann Sigurðarson (born 1956), Icelandic actor, voice actor, and singer
 Jóhann Gunnar Sigurðsson (1882–1906), Icelandic poet
 Jóhann Sigurjónsson (1880–1919), Icelandic playwright and poet
 Jóhann Vilbergsson (born 1935), Icelandic alpine skier
 Marel Jóhann Baldvinsson (born 1980), Icelandic football forward
 Ólafur Jóhann Ólafsson (born 1962), Icelandic businessman, writer, and scientist
 Steingrímur Jóhann Sigfússon (born 1955), Icelandic politician
 Stefán Jóhann Stefánsson (1894–1980), Icelandic politician; prime minister of Iceland 1947–1949
 Jakob Jóhann Sveinsson (born 1982), Icelandic Olympic swimmer

See also 
 Jóhan Troest Davidsen (born 1988), Faroese footballer
 Johann 
 Johan (disambiguation)
 Johannes
 John (given name)
 Alternate forms for the name John

Icelandic masculine given names